Rhinella arunco is a species of toad in the family Bufonidae that is endemic to Chile. Its natural habitats are subtropical or tropical dry shrubland, rivers, intermittent rivers, freshwater marshes, intermittent freshwater marshes, water storage areas, ponds, aquaculture ponds, open excavations, and irrigated land. It is threatened by habitat loss.

References

Sources

arunco
Endemic fauna of Chile
Amphibians of Chile
Amphibians described in 1782
Taxonomy articles created by Polbot